Prado is one of nine parishes (administrative divisions)  in Cabrales, a municipality within the province and autonomous community of Asturias, in northern Spain, near the Picos de Europa mountains.

The postal code is 33555.

Villages
 Canales
 La Molina
 Ortiguero
 La Salce

References

Parishes in Cabrales